Anotia is a genus of derbid planthoppers in the family Derbidae. There are at least 20 described species in Anotia.

Species
These 22 species belong to the genus Anotia:

 Anotia bonnetii Kirby, 1821 c g b
 Anotia burnetii Fitch, 1856 c g
 Anotia caliginosa Ball, 1937 c g b
 Anotia fitchi Van Duzee, 1893 c g b
 Anotia formaster Fennah, 1952 c g
 Anotia invalida Fowler, 1904 c g
 Anotia kirkaldyi Ball, 1902 c g b
 Anotia lineata Ball, 1937 c g
 Anotia marginicornis Fowler, 1904 c g
 Anotia mcateei (Dozier, 1928) c g
 Anotia pellucida Fowler, 1904 c g
 Anotia punctata Metcalf, 1938 c g
 Anotia robertsonii Fitch, 1856 c g b
 Anotia rubrinoda Fennah, 1952 c g
 Anotia ruficornis Fowler, 1904 c g
 Anotia sanguinea Fennah, 1952 c g
 Anotia septentrionalis Anufriev, 1968 c g
 Anotia smithi Fowler, 1904 c g
 Anotia tenella Fowler, 1904 c g
 Anotia uhleri (Van Duzee, 1889) c g b
 Anotia westwoodi Fitch, 1856 c g
 Anotia westwoodii Fitch b

Data sources: i = ITIS, c = Catalogue of Life, g = GBIF, b = Bugguide.net

References

Further reading

External links

 

Otiocerinae
Auchenorrhyncha genera